Luc-Arthur Vebobe (born April 3, 1980) is a French professional basketball player who currently plays for Provence Basket in France's LNB Pro B.

Amateur career
Born  in Antibes, France, Luc-Arthur is the son of former basketball player Saint-Ange Vebobe. He starts his basketball debuts with the Youth team (Espoirs) of  Antibes (1998–1999) before going to the United States in Junior Colleges (Seward County Community College & Foothill College) until 2001. He then joins the University of Hawaii where he plays in NCAA (2001-early 2002).

He played for the French Youth squad at the 1998 FIBA Europe Under-18 Championship where France ranked 10th and at the 2000 FIBA Europe Under-20 Championship where France ranked 8th.

Pro career
Vebobe starts his professional career with its youth club Antibes (Pro A) in 2002 before joining Chalon-sur-Saône (Pro A) for the 2002-2003 season. He then goes to Paris Basket Racing for 2 seasons before going to Spain where he plays for Zaragoza (LEB) during the 2005-2006 season. Due to injuries, Vebobe did not play for any professional club between end of 2006 and beginning of 2008.

For the 2008-2009 season, ALM Evreux (Pro B) is giving him a chance to play again before joining Antibes (Pro B) again for the 2009-2010 season. Playing for Antibes, he won the French basketball cup 16th finals game versus Cholet Basket (76-70) where he drew the attention of coach Erman Kunter. He then joins Cholet Basket (Pro A), the 2010 French champion and plays the Euroleague for the 2010-2011 season.

Notes

External links
Euroleague.net Profile
Luc-Arthur Vebobe profile on LNB.fr

1980 births
Living people
People from Antibes
ALM Évreux Basket players
Basket Zaragoza players
Cholet Basket players
Chorale Roanne Basket players
Élan Chalon players
Foothill College alumni
Fos Provence Basket players
French expatriate basketball people in Spain
French expatriate basketball people in the United States
French men's basketball players
Hawaii Rainbow Warriors basketball players
Junior college men's basketball players in the United States
Olympique Antibes basketball players
Paris Racing Basket players
Power forwards (basketball)